The Wenjindu Port is a land port of China on the Sham Chun River (Shenzhen River), in , Luohu, Shenzhen, Guangdong. Its counterpart on the opposite side of the border is the Man Kam To Control Point. 

Wenjindu Port, one of the road crossings with the New Territories of Hong Kong across the border, is located in the area.

See also 
 Wenjindu Passenger Coach Station
On the opposite side of the border:
 Man Kam To 
 Man Kam To Road

References 

China–Hong Kong border crossings
Luohu District